Craig Alexander Carlson (born 1963) is an American oceanographer. He is a founding co-editor of the Annual Review of Marine Science and a recipient of the 2015 G. Evelyn Hutchinson Award.

Early life and education 
Craig Alexander Carlson was born to parents Paula  and David Carlson.
He attended Colby College, graduating with his bachelor's degree in 1986. He then attended the University of Maryland for a PhD in marine science, graduating in 1994 under the advisorship of Hugh Ducklow.

Career 
He completed a postdoctoral appointment at the Bermuda Institute of Ocean Sciences (BIOS) where he researched the biogeochemical cycling of dissolved organic carbon in marine systems. He became a faculty member at BIOS in 1996. In 2001 he joined the University of California, Santa Barbara in the Department of Ecology, Evolution, and Marine Biology. In 2009 he was a founding co-editor of the Annual Review of Marine Science; he is still co-editor as of 2021.

Awards and honors 
In 2002 he was the first recipient of the Ocean Sciences Early Career Award from the American Geophysical Union. In 2015 he was awarded the G. Evelyn Hutchinson Award from the Association for the Sciences of Limnology and Oceanography for his contributions to understanding how dissolved organic carbon relates to microbes. In 2018, he was named a fellow of the American Association for the Advancement of Science.

Personal life 
He is married to Alison ; they have three children together.

References 

Living people
University System of Maryland alumni
American oceanographers
Colby College alumni
University of California, Santa Barbara faculty
1963 births
Annual Reviews (publisher) editors
Fellows of the American Association for the Advancement of Science